"What Part of No" is a song written by Wayne Perry and Gerald Smith, and recorded by American country music artist Lorrie Morgan.  It was released in December 1992 as the second single from her album Watch Me.  The song reached Number One on the U.S. Billboard Hot Country Singles & Tracks charts dated for the week of February 27, 1993, holding the Number One position for three weeks.  To date, it is Morgan's biggest hit.

She performed the song on the live telecast of the 11th annual Music City News Country Songwriters Awards.

Content
A woman in a social setting is approached repeatedly by a persistent man who sends her a rose, then buys her a drink and asks her to dance. The woman, uninterested in the man despite his advances, finally asks "What part of 'no' don't you understand?"

Analyses
The writer Sandy Carter cites "What Part of No" in an article on the politics of country music, giving it as an example of his argument, "Most significantly, the commercial appeal of the current generation of country women seems directly linked to a feminist oriented lyric." He argues that this song, together with Morgan's other hits "Watch Me" and "Five Minutes", sends a message that the singer "takes clear control of her relationships" and then discusses similar trends in songs by other artists. The song is also mentioned in the introduction to a legal article, "What Part of 'No' Don't You Understand?", as "forcefully relat[ing] the anguish of a victim of sexual harassment."

Chart positions

Year-end charts

References

External links
 What Part of No at The Phrase Finder

1993 singles
Lorrie Morgan songs
Song recordings produced by Richard Landis
BNA Records singles
1992 songs
Songs written by Wayne Perry (country music)
Songs with feminist themes